Roger A. Sedjo (born 1939) is an economist and senior fellow and director of Resources for the Future. Forestry and land use have been major focuses of his career.

He has been a consultant for the World Bank, the Asian Development Bank, the U.S. Agency for Internal Development, the Food and Agricultural Organization of the United Nations, and the Organisation for Economic Co-operation and Development.

In 1991 he wrote a paper reporting that New England has much heavier forest cover than it did in the mid-19th century, which has since been widely cited by critics of environmentalism.

Publications
Surviving Global Warming: Why Eliminating Greenhouse Gases Isn't Enough (2019) The MIT Press

References

External links
Bio at Resources for the Future

American economists
Sustainability advocates
1939 births
Living people